Godiva rachelae is a species of sea slug, a nudibranch, a shell-less marine gastropod mollusc in the family Facelinidae.

Distribution 
This species was described from Tanzania. It has been reported from Queensland, Australia.

Description
Godiva rachelae is a slender pale-bodied nudibranch with many cerata with a purple band near the tip. Its head has a pair of brown lines running into the oral tentacles which have two translucent purple bands.

Ecology
Godiva rachelae preys on hydroids.

References

Facelinidae
Gastropods described in 1980